Man on the Edge (Korean: 박수건달; RR: Baksoogundal) is a 2013 South Korean film directed by Jo Jin-kyu. The story follows Gwang-ho (Park Shin-yang), the right-hand man of a powerful crime boss, as he struggles with the realization that he is destined to become a shaman.
Man on the Edge is director Jo Jin-kyu's fifth film; his debut feature, My Wife Is a Gangster, is credited with sparking the popularity of gangster themes in Korean cinema.
In a press conference for the film, lead actor Park Shin-yang told the audience that among his other preparations, he went to a shaman to learn more about the traditional practices.

Plot 
After a knife wound alters the fate line on his palm, high-class gangster Gwang-ho experiences a series of strange events, including voices beckoning him and objects inexplicably moving around him. One such event occurs when a newspaper, seemingly blown by the wind, persistently follows Gwang-ho as he tries to run away. The newspaper features a large ad for a fortune teller, who Gwang-ho decides to visit. The fortune teller reveals that the strange events are being caused by a spirit. In order to accept the spirit and begin fulfilling his destiny as a shaman, he must perform a ritual. Unable to escape his fate, Gwang-ho begins a double life, working as a fortune teller by day and a criminal by evening—a life that is increasingly difficult to maintain. Meanwhile, Tae-joo (Kim Jung-tae), a rival member of the gang, is plotting to get rid of Gwang-ho and take his place. Tae-joo's henchmen spy on Gwang-ho, and as they begin to discover his secret, they use their discoveries to try to destroy him.

Cast 
 Park Shin-yang as Park Gwang-Ho
 Kim Jung-tae as Cha Tae-Joo
 Uhm Ji-won as Fortune Teller Myung
 Jung Hye-young as Dr. Choi Mi-Sook
 Yoon Song-yi as Han Soo-Min
 Kim Sung-kyun as Ko Choon-Bong
 Choi Ji-ho as Wang Dae-Sik
 Choi Il-hwa as the boss
 Park Jung-ja as the elder fortune teller
 Kim Hyeong-beom as Cha Tae-Joo's henchman
 Cho Jin-woong as the prosecutor

Release & Reception 
The film was released on January 9, 2013, and remained at #1 at the South Korean box office throughout the month, selling 3,897,969 tickets during its theatrical run. It received mixed reviews, with audiences generally rating it higher than film critics. Many reporters described it as a fun movie with compelling performances; some criticized the story's unrealistic circumstances, while others hailed the story as unique and interesting.
When the film was released in Japan, Japanese production and distribution company SPO held a 'Park Shin-yang Festival 2014' at Toho Cinemas Roppongi Hills. The festival ran from February 1–14, screening other films featuring the actor in addition to the main feature.

Awards & nominations

References

External links
 
 
 
Baksoogundal at Movist
 
Man on the Edge at the Korean Film Council
Baksoogundal at Daum
Bak-su-geon-dal at Rotten Tomatoes

2013 films
South Korean crime comedy-drama films
2010s Korean-language films
2013 comedy films
2010s South Korean films